Legend of Fae is an action role-playing puzzle video game developed and published by Endless Fluff Games  for the PC Windows in 2011.

Gameplay

Plot

Reception
In a positive review, Nathan Meunier from GamePro opined Legend of Fae "packs a surprising level of gameplay depth to round out its accessible nature and lighthearted vibe," with a "dynamic, fun" and "deep" combat system and an "endearing" story. Andrew Barker from RPGFan gave this "charming, yet deceptively deep, indie puzzle title supported by some top-notch RPG features" an overall score of 87%, opining it is "a game you should absolutely find time to play."

References

External links

Legend of Fae on Steam

2011 video games
Action role-playing video games
Fantasy video games
Indie video games
Puzzle video games
Single-player video games
Video games developed in the United States
Video games featuring female protagonists
Windows games
Windows-only games